The 2007 Speedway Conference League was the third tier/division of British speedway.

Summary
The title was won by Scunthorpe Scorpions for the second successive year. Scunthorpe also won the Knockout Cup, Conference Trophy and Conference League Fours. Their leading rider was Tai Woffinden who also won the Conference League Riders' Championship.

The Oxford Lions took their senior side team name Oxford Cheetahs following the withdrawal of the senior side from the 2007 Elite League speedway season. In June 2007, businessman Allen Trump invested in the club (also sponsoring the club via LCD Publishing) to secure the lease on the track and the Cheetahs completed the 2007 season in the Conference League, replacing their junior side the Oxford Lions.

Final league table

Key
HW=Home win
HD=Home draw
HL=Home loss
AW=Away win
AD=Away draw
AL=Away loss

Play-offs

Conference League Knockout Cup
The 2007 Conference League Knockout Cup was the tenth edition of the Knockout Cup for tier three teams. Scunthorpe Scorpions were the winners for the second successive year.

First round

Quarter-finals

Semi-finals

Final

Others Honours
Conference Trophy - Scunthorpe Scorpions
Conference league pairs - Boston Barracudas (Paul Cooper and Simon Lambert)
Conference league fours - Scunthorpe Scorpions
Conference League Riders' Championship - Tai Woffinden (Scunthorpe Scorpions)

See also
List of United Kingdom Speedway League Champions

References

Conference
Speedway Conference League